The 2003–04 Michigan State Spartans men's basketball team represented Michigan State University in the 2003–04 NCAA Division I men's basketball season. The Spartans played their home games at Breslin Center in East Lansing, Michigan. They were coached by Tom Izzo in his ninth year as head coach. MSU finished the season with a record of 18–12, 12–4 to finish in a tie for second place in Big Ten play. The Spartans received a bid to the NCAA tournament for the seventh consecutive year where they lost in the First Round to Nevada.

Previous season 
The Spartans finished the 2002–03 season with an overall record of 22–12, 10–6 to finish in fifth place in the Big Ten. Michigan State received a No. 7 seed in the NCAA tournament, their sixth straight trip to the Tournament, and advanced to the Elite Eight, their fourth trip to the Elite Eight under Tom Izzo.

Season summary 
The Spartans were led by sophomore Paul Davis (15.9 PPG, 6.2 PRG, 2.0 APG) and juniors Chris Hill (13.8 PPG, 2.8 RPG, 3.9 APG) and Kelvin Tolbert (10.7 PPG, 3.6 RPG, 2.0 PAG). The Spartans began the season ranked No. 3 in the country and faced a difficult non-conference schedule. MSU fell on the road to No. 6 Kansas in the second game of the season. Two wins followed the loss before a murderer's row of a schedule which included three straight losses to No. 6 Duke, in overtime to No. 14 Oklahoma at the Palace of Auburn Hills, and to No. 8 Kentucky at Ford Field in the Basketbowl. The Spartans followed this losing streak by losing two of their final four non-conference games including at No. 17 Syracuse and dropped out of the rankings. They finished the non-conference slate at 5–6.

After a loss to open Big Ten play to No. 21 Wisconsin, the Spartans recovered to win seven of their next eight and six of their last seven Big Ten games. They finished in a tie for second place in the Big Ten at 12–4 and 17–10 overall. A win over Northwestern in the Big Ten tournament quarterfinals was followed by a third loss of the season to No. 17 Wisconsin.

The Spartans received a No. 7 seed in the NCAA Tournament, reaching the tournament for the seventh consecutive year. But, for the second time in three years, the Spartans were knocked out in the First Round, this time by Nevada.

Roster

Schedule and results

|-
!colspan=9 style=| Exhibition

|-
!colspan=9 style=| Non-conference regular season

|-
!colspan=9 style=|Big Ten regular season

|-
!colspan=9 style=|<span style=>Big Ten tournament

|-
!colspan=9 style=|NCAA tournament

Player statistics 

Source

Rankings

*AP does not release post-NCAA tournament rankings

Awards and honors 
 Paul Davis – All-Big Ten First Team
 Paul Davis – NABC All-District Team
 Chris Hill – All-Big Ten Second Team
 Chris Hill – Academic All-American First Team 
 Kelvin Torbert – All-Big Ten Third Team (Coaches), All-Big Ten Honorable Mention (Media)
 Shannon Brown – All-Big Ten Freshman Team

References

Michigan State Spartans men's basketball seasons
Michigan State Spartans
2003 in sports in Michigan
2004 in sports in Michigan
Michigan State